Francis v. Franklin, 471 U.S. 307 (1985), is a United States Supreme Court decision reaffirming due process principles elucidated in Sandstrom v. Montana, that the prosecution bears the burden of proof of establishing the mental element of intent. Justice Brennan wrote that under the Due Process Clause of the Fourteenth Amendment, a jury instruction saying that "a person of sound mind is presumed to intend the natural and probable consequences of his acts, but the presumption may be rebutted" is unconstitutional, because it shifted the burden of proof is shifted from the prosecution to the defense.

References

External links
 

United States Supreme Court cases
United States Supreme Court cases of the Burger Court
United States criminal due process case law
1985 in United States case law
Due Process Clause